Sea Swift is Australia's largest privately owned shipping company. It operates in Northern Australia, mainly servicing remote and regional communities in Far North Queensland and the Northern Territory. The company provides freight and passenger services, and maritime logistical support, operating four container ships in addition to barges, tugs and landing craft.

History
Sea Swift started in 1987 when founder Sid Faithfull identified an opportunity to service Gulf of Carpentaria fishing fleets by mothershipping from Karumba.  Over the next 25 years, Sea Swift grew to become Australia's largest privately owned shipping company, operating regular freight, mothershipping, project logistics, and passenger cruise services from its Cairns headquarters to communities throughout Far North Queensland. Expanding to 19 vessels, six depots, and 300 staff in Queensland, today Sea Swift continues to service remote communities along Cape York Peninsula and in the Gulf of Carpentaria, as well as the Torres Strait Islands, including Horn Island, Thursday Island and the outer islands.
  
In early 2013, through the acquisition of Tiwi Barge, Sea Swift commenced an operation in the Northern Territory. The initial two-vessel and 15-person operation servicing four destinations has grown to become a nine-vessel, 144-person, three-depot operation servicing 25 destinations across the Territory.

In total, Sea Swift now has 26 vessels, nine depots, and more than 430 staff in its operation across Northern Australia.

Services
Sea Swift has four main service streams:
 Project logistics – barge/tug and landing craft operations and crewed (or bare boat) vessel chartering.
 Sea freight – scheduled liner and coastal freight services accommodating regional break bulk, bulk fuel and container freight requirements.
 Mothershipping – resupply and refuelling of trawlers at sea.
 Passenger cruise – a working barge cruise from Cairns to the Torres Strait.

Sea Swift's Project Logistics unit has seen jobs completed domestically to destinations including Brisbane, Townsville, Gladstone, Bundaberg, Torres Strait Islands, Mornington Island, Lizard Island, Palm Island, Darwin, Gove, Tiwi Islands, Arnhem Land, and many others – as far south as Newcastle and as far west as Western Australia coastal mine sites. Internationally, jobs have been completed to Papua New Guinea, South East Asia and the South Pacific. Clients serviced include BHP Billiton, Rio Tinto Alcan, South 32, Gemco, Woolworths, ALPA, Mt Gibson Iron, Sedgman, Bechtel, Santos, Queensland Government, Northern Territory Government, and many others.

Ships
The following vessels are currently within Sea Swift's fleet.

Container ships
MV Trinity Bay – General cargo
MV Newcastle Bay – General cargo
MV Kestrel Bay – Fishery support vessel
MV Endeavour Bay - Fishery support vessel

Landing craft
Arnhem Trader
Biquele Bay
Coral Bay
Fourcroy
Kerema Chief
Malu Chief
Malu Explorer
Malu Titan
Malu Trader
Malu Trojan
Malu Warrior
Tiwi Islander
Temple Bay
Territorian

Tugs
Arjuna
Agros
Arion
Cossack
Norman River
Staaten River

Barges
SSB1802
SSB1803
Chryssus
Comal
Carcinos

References

External links
Sea Swift website

Cairns, Queensland
Darwin, Northern Territory
Far North Queensland
Torres Strait Islands
Companies based in Queensland
Companies based in the Northern Territory